The 2022–23 Seton Hall Pirates men's basketball team represents Seton Hall University in the 2022–23 NCAA Division I men's basketball season. They are led by first-year head coach Shaheen Holloway. The Pirates play their home games at the Prudential Center in Newark, New Jersey and Walsh Gymnasium in South Orange, New Jersey as members of the Big East Conference

Previous season 
The Pirates finished the 2021–22 season 21–11, 11–8 in Big East play to finish in sixth place. They defeated Georgetown in the first round of the Big East Tournament before losing to UConn. They received an at-large bid to the NCAA tournament as the No. 8 seed in the South region where they lost in the First Round to TCU.

On March 21, 2022, head coach Kevin Willard left to the school to coach Maryland. On March 30, the school named former player Shaheen Holloway as the team's new head coach. He previously coached for Saint Peter's and was an assistant coach for Seton Hall from 2010 to 2018.

Offseason

Departures

Incoming transfers

2022 recruiting class

|}

Roster

Schedule and results 

|-
! colspan=9 style=| Non-conference regular season

|-
!colspan=12 style=|Big East regular season

|-
!colspan=12 style=|Big East tournament

|-
!colspan=12 style=| NIT tournament

Rankings

References 

Seton Hall
Seton Hall
Seton Hall Pirates men's basketball seasons
Seton Hall